Bone morphogenetic protein 10 (BMP10) is a protein that in humans is encoded by the BMP10 gene.

BMP10 is a polypeptide belonging to the TGF-β superfamily of proteins. It is a novel protein that, unlike most other BMP's, is likely to be involved in the trabeculation of the heart. Bone morphogenetic proteins are known for their ability to induce bone and cartilage development. BMP10 is categorized as a BMP since it shares a large sequence homology with other BMP's in the TGF-β superfamily.

Further reading

References

External links
 

Developmental genes and proteins
Bone morphogenetic protein
TGFβ domain